On the Ropes is an Australian drama series which screened on SBS on 28 November 2018.  The four-part miniseries follows a young Iraqi-Australian woman who follows her dream of becoming an elite women's boxing trainer. Production for the series began in May 2018.

Synopsis
Amirah Al-Amir is an aspiring Iraqi-Australian boxing trainer who often has to deal with the physicality and deep-seated culture of misogyny in the sporting world. She works in the family gym in Sydney's western suburbs with world champion father Sami and her two brothers. Amirah secures a debut professional match for her hard-nosed fighter Jess Connor with the help of Strick, Sami's long-time promoter. Her father is furious that she went behind his back and threatens to cut her off.

Episodes

Cast
 Nicole Chamoun as Amirah Al-Amir
 Igal Naor as Sami Al-Amir
 Keisha Castle-Hughes as Jessica Connor 
 Jack Thompson as Strick
 Louis Hunter as Lachy
 Tyler De Nawi as Hayder Al-Amir 
 Neveen Hanna as Layla Al-Amir
 Claude Jabbour as Tariq Al-Amir
 Setareh Naghoni as Ranya
 Priscilla Doueihy as Amal
 Marlee Barber as Jacinda Jinx Katz
 Otis Dhanji as Iggy
 Michael Denkha as Ahmad
 Bozana Diab as Mina
 Nader Hamden as Ben
 Wendy Strehlow as Gloria

Awards and nominations

The series was nominated for three Logie Awards in 2019; Most Outstanding Miniseries / Telemovie, Most Outstanding Lead Actress (Nicole Chamoun) and Most Outstanding Supporting Actress (Keisha Castle-Hughes). It was also nominated for a 2019 Director's Guild Award for Shannon Murphy, a 2019 Actor's Equity Award for the ensemble cast and a 2019 Writer's Guild Award for Best Miniseries. It is nominated for a 2019 AACTA Award for Best Telefeature or Miniseries.

See also

List of Australian television series
List of programs broadcast by Special Broadcasting Service

References

External links

2018 Australian television series debuts
2018 Australian television series endings
2010s Australian crime television series
2010s Australian drama television series
English-language television shows
Special Broadcasting Service original programming
Television shows set in Sydney
SBS Sport